Raitzin is a surname. Notable people with the surname include:

Michelle Raitzin, singer
Misha Raitzin (1930–1990), Ukrainian operatic tenor